Golden Helmet may refer to:
 Golden Helmet (Poland), an annual Polish speedway event
 Golden Helmet (People's Republic of China), an annual Chinese military aviation competition
 Golden Helmet of Pardubice, an annual Czech speedway event
 Kultainen kypärä, a Finnish ice hockey award given to the best player in Liiga.
 Guldhjälmen, a Swedish ice hockey award
 Casque d'Or (English: Golden Helmet), a 1952 French film